The Shock, is a hidden camera reality television television program which was broadcast on MBC 1, debuting during Ramadan 2016, and airing through Ramadan of 2017. The program was presented by Alaa Huusein and Karim Kojak.

Cast 
 Alaa Huusein
 Karim Kojak
 Khaled Alsaqer
 Turki Al Yousef
 Tarek Sweid
 Ahmed Landolsi
 Nancy Khoury

Morocco controversy 
After the success of the first season, the team decided to add other countries to the list of countries in which the program is being filmed. The country was chosen from the Persian Gulf, Jordan and Europe from Germany, then from North Africa, Morocco, but the latter replaced Tunisia until the last words. After the "Moroccan Ministry of Communication" refused to grant the license to the team, citing that "the program discredits Morocco and that it affects the rights of women and children."

References 

Arabic-language television shows
Arabic television series